Gołuszowice  is a village located in Poland, in the Opole Voivodeship, Głubczyce County and Gmina Głubczyce. The village has an old 16th-century church.

References

Villages in Głubczyce County